Glucosylceramide beta-1,4-galactosyltransferase (lactosylceramide synthase, uridine diphosphate-galactose:glucosyl ceramide beta 1-4 galactosyltransferase, UDP-Gal:glucosylceramide beta1->4galactosyltransferase, GalT-2, UDP-galactose:beta-D-glucosyl-(1<->1)-ceramide beta-1,4-galactosyltransferase) is an enzyme with systematic name UDP-alpha-D-galactose:beta-D-glucosyl-(1<->1)-ceramide 4-beta-D-galactosyltransferase. This enzyme catalyses the following chemical reaction

 UDP-alpha-D-galactose + beta-D-glucosyl-(1<->1)-ceramide  UDP + beta-D-galactosyl-(1->4)-beta-D-glucosyl-(1<->1)-ceramide

Involved in the synthesis of several different major classes of glycosphingolipids.

References

External links 

EC 2.4.1